Bryolymnia biformata is a moth of the family Noctuidae first described by Donald Lafontaine and J. Walsh in 2010. It is known only from the Huachuca, Patagonia, and Santa Rita Mountains in south-eastern Arizona.

The length of the forewings is 11–12 mm. Adults have been collected between mid-June and late July.

Etymology
The specific name biformata is from Latin and refers to the two color forms of this species.

References

External links

Hadeninae
Moths described in 2010